Magdalena Adriana González Furlong (born 4 March 1958) is a Mexican politician who was affiliated with the National Action Party. As of 2014 she served as Deputy of the LIX Legislature of the Mexican Congress representing the State of Mexico. 
In the 2015 election period she participated as a candidate for municipal president of Tlalnepantla in the Citizen's Movement Party.

History

Political career
Deputy of the LIX Legislature of the Mexican Congress
Outreach coordinator of the secretariat of political promotion of women in the CDE on PAN in the state of Mexico.
Media director of CDM in Tlalnepantla, State of Mexico.
Director of project management and execution of the coordination of social communication of the CDM in Tlalnepantla, State of Mexico.
Program director for electoral coordination of PAN activists in the municipality of Tlalnepantla, State of Mexico.
General Secretary and political training coordinator of the National Academy of Women.
President and founder of the State Academy of Women in the state of Mexico.
Regional coordinator in the state of Mexico in the group Friends of Fox.
Participating in the parliament of women in Mexico.

Administrative career
General Director of Statistics of the Ministry of Programming and Budget.
Regional deputy director of SEDESOL in the state of Mexico.
Information analyst in the Ministry of Programming and Budget.
Information analysis supervisor of the fifth population and housing census in the Ministry of Programming and Budget.
Communications director and press of the civic council of Tlalnepantla, State of Mexico.

Academic career
Diploma in Strategic Management in Public Administration at the ITAM.
Director of the School of Communication Sciences "La Salle" College in the State of Mexico.
BA in Journalism from the School of Journalism Carlos Septien Garcia.

References

External links
 
 

1958 births
Living people
Politicians from the State of Mexico
Women members of the Chamber of Deputies (Mexico)
Members of the Chamber of Deputies (Mexico) for the State of Mexico
National Action Party (Mexico) politicians
Deputies of the LIX Legislature of Mexico